Events from the year 1883 in Canada.

Incumbents

Crown 
 Monarch – Victoria

Federal government 
 Governor General – John Campbell, Marquess of Lorne (until October 23) then Henry Petty-Fitzmaurice, 5th Marquess of Lansdowne 
 Prime Minister – John A. Macdonald
 Chief Justice – William Johnstone Ritchie (New Brunswick)
 Parliament – 5th (from 8 February)

Provincial governments

Lieutenant governors 
Lieutenant Governor of British Columbia – Clement Francis Cornwall 
Lieutenant Governor of Manitoba – James Cox Aikins 
Lieutenant Governor of New Brunswick – Robert Duncan Wilmot  
Lieutenant Governor of Nova Scotia – Adams George Archibald (until July 4) then Matthew Henry Richey    
Lieutenant Governor of Ontario – John Beverley Robinson   
Lieutenant Governor of Prince Edward Island – Thomas Heath Haviland 
Lieutenant Governor of Quebec – Théodore Robitaille

Premiers 
Premier of British Columbia – Robert Beaven (until January 29) then William Smithe 
Premier of Manitoba – John Norquay 
Premier of New Brunswick – Daniel Lionel Hanington (until March 3) then Andrew George Blair  
Premier of Nova Scotia – William Thomas Pipes  
Premier of Ontario – Oliver Mowat    
Premier of Prince Edward Island – William Wilfred Sullivan 
Premier of Quebec – Joseph-Alfred Mousseau

Territorial governments

Lieutenant governors 
 Lieutenant Governor of Keewatin – James Cox Aikins
 Lieutenant Governor of the North-West Territories – Edgar Dewdney

Events
January 23 – Manitoba election
January 29 – William Smithe becomes premier of British Columbia, replacing Robert Beaven
February 27 – Ontario election: Sir Oliver Mowat's Liberals win a fourth consecutive majority
August 31 – The Calgary Herald publishes its first issue
November 18 – Canada adopts Standard Time
December 1  – Regina officially declared a town.

Full date unknown
Andrew Blair becomes premier of New Brunswick, replacing Daniel Hanington
Augusta Stowe, daughter of Emily Stowe, is the first woman graduated by the Toronto Medical School. 
The Toronto Women's Suffrage Association replaces the Literary Club of 1876. 
Nickel-copper ore is discovered at Murray Mine in Sudbury during construction of the Canadian Pacific Railway (CPR).
Medicine Hat is settled by European Canadians when the CPR crosses the South Saskatchewan River.

Births

January to June
January 30 – Mountenay Du Val, conservationist
February 28 – Fernand Rinfret, politician (d.1939)
March 4 – Sam Langford, boxer (d.1956)
March 5 – Marius Barbeau, ethnographer and folklorist (d.1969)
March 25 – Talbot Papineau, lawyer and soldier (d.1917)
April 18 – Isabel Meighen, wife of Arthur Meighen, 9th Prime Minister of Canada (d.1985)
June 22 – John Bracken, politician and 11th Premier of Manitoba (d.1969)

July to December
August 7 – Gordon Sidney Harrington, politician and Premier of Nova Scotia (d.1943)
October 2 – Robert Boyle, physicist
November 30 – James Garfield Gardiner, politician, Minister and Premier of Saskatchewan (d.1962)
December 27 – Cyrus S. Eaton, investment banker, businessman and philanthropist (d.1979)

Deaths
June 18 – François Norbert Blanchet, missionary (b.1795)
June 26 – Sir Edward Sabine, soldier and scientist (b.1788) 
June 30 – Albert James Smith, politician and Minister (b.1822)
August 14 – James Cockburn, politician (b.1819) 
August 16 – Richard Alleyn, lawyer, judge, educator and politician (b.1835)

Historical documents
Destitute Cree insist government live up to its treaty obligations

Haida story of The Man in the Moon repeated by ethnographer James G. Swan and illustrated by Johnny Kit Elswa

Routing CPR line away from more fertile prairie land will hinder settlement

Sandford Fleming's contributions to establishing standard time

Mounties return stolen horses, but deny U.S. Army claim that Cree will wage war in Montana

One cattle hand shoots another, then outraces Mounties to U.S. border

References
  

 
Years of the 19th century in Canada
Canada
1883 in North America